John Alfred Wingblade (February 26, 1883 – May 14, 1984) was a politician from Alberta, Canada. He served in the Legislative Assembly of Alberta from 1935 to 1963 as a member of the Social Credit Party.

Political career
Wingblade ran for a seat to the Alberta Legislature in the 1935 general election as the Social Credit candidate in the riding of Wetaskiwin.  He won on the first ballot, defeating incumbent Liberal MLA Hugh Montgomery.

Wingblade stood for a second term in the 1940 general election. Wingblade won on the second ballot against two challengers.

Wingblade ran for a third term in the 1944 general election. Again he faced Hugh Montgomery, who ran this time as an independent, as well as two other challengers. Wingblade held his seat with a comfortable majority.

In the 1948 general election, Wingblade won a three-way battle with a larger popular vote than in the 1944 election.

In the 1952 general election, Wingblade faced three challengers, including an independent Social Credit candidate.  His popular vote slipped slightly from the previous election, but he held the district with a clear majority.

The 1955 general election saw a four-way race in Wetaskiwin. Wingblade won on the second count.

Wingblade faced three challengers in the 1959 general election.  He was returned to office with the largest majority and popular vote of his political career.

Wingblade retired from provincial politics at dissolution of the Assembly in 1963.

References

External links
Legislative Assembly of Alberta Members Listing

1883 births
1984 deaths
Alberta Social Credit Party MLAs
Canadian centenarians
Men centenarians